Stenilema subaurantiaca is a moth in the  subfamily Arctiinae. It was described by Strand in 1912. It is found in Malawi.

References

Natural History Museum Lepidoptera generic names catalog

Endemic fauna of Malawi
Moths described in 1912
Lithosiini